Nicholas Newlin is an American rugby league footballer who has represented the United States national team. The captain of the Hawks' domestic-based team, Newlin was named as co-captain of the side for the 2017 World Cup.

Early life
Born and raised in Port Washington, Wisconsin, Newlin played soccer, American football, baseball and basketball as a child. In 2008, Newlin joined the United States Marine Corps and spent four years serving in Afghanistan. He moved to Atlanta, Georgia at the completion of his service, and discovered rugby league in 2014 through the Atlanta Rhinos.

Playing career
In his debut season of rugby league, Newlin was named captain of the Atlanta Rhinos for their inaugural season in the USA Rugby League. He made his debut for the United States national team against Canada in September 2015, and was named captain of the side in July 2016 for their match against Jamaica. For the 2017 World Cup, Newlin was named co-captain alongside professional Mark Offerdahl.

International caps

References

External links
2017 RLWC profile

1980s births
Living people
American rugby league players
Atlanta Rhinos captains
Atlanta Rhinos players
People from Port Washington, Wisconsin
Rugby league props
United States Marine Corps personnel of the War in Afghanistan (2001–2021)
United States national rugby league team captains
United States national rugby league team players